Mourad Batna (born 27 June 1990) is a Moroccan footballer currently plays for Al-Fateh as a winger.

References

External links
 

1990 births
Living people
Moroccan footballers
Moroccan expatriate footballers
Association football wingers
Hassania Agadir players
Fath Union Sport players
Emirates Club players
Al Wahda FC players
Al Jazira Club players
Al-Fateh SC players
UAE Pro League players
Saudi Professional League players
Expatriate footballers in the United Arab Emirates
Moroccan expatriate sportspeople in the United Arab Emirates
Expatriate footballers in Saudi Arabia
Moroccan expatriate sportspeople in Saudi Arabia
2016 African Nations Championship players
Morocco A' international footballers